Ninian Crichton Stuart (born 16 March 1957) is the Hereditary Keeper of Falkland Palace, a former Scottish royal palace in Fife.

He is the grandson of Lt-Col Lord Ninian Edward Crichton-Stuart (15 May 1883 – 2 October 1915), the second son of John Crichton-Stuart, 3rd Marquess of Bute and the Honourable Gwendolen Mary Anne Fitzalan Howard, daughter of Edward Fitzalan-Howard, 1st Baron Howard of Glossop.

He is a cousin of John Crichton-Stuart, 7th Marquess of Bute (26 April 1958 – 22 March 2021), formerly known as 'Johnny Dumfries' while a racing driver, who won the 1988 24 Hours of Le Mans. They both attended Ampleforth College, as is customary for male members of the Crichton-Stuart family.

Stuart lives in Falkland and is a former Stewardship Director for the Falkland Heritage Trust. He is a co-founder of Falkland Centre for Stewardship, which ran the annual Big Tent festival that took place in July in Falkland.

References

Living people
People educated at Ampleforth College
1957 births
Ninian
People of Falkland Palace